An ootheca  (pl. oothecae  ) is a type of egg mass made by any member of a variety of species including mollusks (such as Turbinella laevigata), mantises, and cockroaches.

The word is a Latinized combination of oo-, meaning "egg", from the Greek word ōon (cf. Latin ovum), and theca, meaning a "cover" or "container", from the Greek theke. Ootheke is Greek for ovary.

Oothecae are made up of structural proteins and tanning agents that cause the protein to harden around the eggs, providing protection and stability. The production of ootheca convergently evolved across numerous insect species due to a selection for protection from parasites and other forms of predation, as the complex structure of the shell casing provides an evolutionary reproductive advantage (although the fitness and lifespan also depend on other factors such as the temperature of the incubating ootheca). Oothecae are most notably found in the orders Blattodea (Cockroaches) and Mantodea (Praying mantids), as well as in the subfamilies Cassidinae (Coleoptera) and Korinninae (Phasmatodea).

The ootheca protects the eggs from microorganisms, parasitoids, predators, and weather; the ootheca maintains a stable water balance through variation in its surface, as it is porous in dry climates to protect against desiccation, and smooth in wet climates to protect against oversaturation. Its composition and appearance vary depending on species and environment.

Image gallery

See also
Sang piao xiao, mantis oothecae used in traditional Chinese medicine
Egg cases, also known as egg capsules

References

External links

Photo of a madagascar hissing cockroach ootheca

Oology
Protostome biology